The Mischianza (Italian for "medley" or "mixture"), or Meschianza, was an elaborate fête given in honor of British General Sir William Howe in Philadelphia on May 18, 1778.

Howe, the commander-in-chief of the British forces in America during the early years of the Revolution, had resigned his post and was about to return to England. The ball was thrown by his corps of officers, who put up a sum of 3,312 guineas to pay for it (approximately US$682,929 in 2017 prices). The events, which were planned by Captain John André and John Montresor, included a regatta along the Delaware River, accompanied by three musical bands and a 17-gun salute by British warships, a procession, a tournament of jousting knights, and a ball and banquet with fireworks display. The site was Walnut Grove, the rural seat of Joseph Wharton of the well-known Philadelphia Whartons.

The crowd of over 400 guests included Admiral of the Fleet Richard Lord Howe, the general's brother; General Henry Clinton, commandant at New York and Howe's replacement; Peggy Shippen, future wife of Benedict Arnold; Peggy Chew, daughter of Benjamin Chew; Rebecca Franks, daughter of loyalist David Franks; Lord Cathcart; Banastre Tarleton; and Wilhelm von Knyphausen, a General of the Hessians, a mercenary unit of the German Military.

André, who was "social director" to the army in winter, was known as a poet, actor, etc.  He was also well known as a competent violinist. As stage director, he painted background scenes for plays produced by acting members of the English Army.

Sources
 Elizabeth F. Ellet, The Women of the American Revolution, Third Edition. New York: Baker and Scribner, 1849.

External links
The Book of Days article on the Mischianza
Article in American Heritage magazine by Morris Bishop
Mischianza, 1881 painting of the event by Frederick James
Engraved Mischianza ticket
Major André's Description of the Mischianza
Sketch by John André from the event
An account of the event

Music festivals in Philadelphia
Philadelphia in the American Revolution
History of Philadelphia
Italian words and phrases
1778 in Pennsylvania